Prusy-Boškůvky is a municipality in Vyškov District in the South Moravian Region of the Czech Republic. It has about 700 inhabitants.

Administrative parts
The municipality is made up of villages of Boškůvky and Moravské Prusy, and of hamlet of Zouvalka.

History
The first written mention about Prusy is from 1349 and about Boškůvky is from 1465. Moravské Prusy and Boškůvky were merged into one municipality in 1964. Zouvalka was administrative part of Vyškov in 1964–2016. Since 1 January 2017 it is a part of Prusy-Boškůvky.

References

Villages in Vyškov District